The Singular Universe and the Reality of Time: A Proposal in Natural Philosophy is a book about cosmology, philosophy of time, metaphysics and scientific naturalism by the American theoretical physicist Lee Smolin and the Brazilian philosopher Roberto Mangabeira Unger. The authors argue that the current crisis in cosmology is a result of physicists making the wrong commitments to universalizing local experiments and to a block universe. They suggest instead that new research projects would be revealed if we took seriously the idea of one, and only one, universe as well as the reality of our experience of time. This new paradigm, they say, would also give rise to the revolutionary notion that the laws of nature might not be immutable. The book was initially published by Cambridge University Press on December 8, 2014.

Synopsis
The book discusses a number of philosophical and physical ideas on the true role of time in the Universe. The text is roughly divided into two halves, the first one written by Unger, and the second by Smolin, both developing the same themes in different ways, with Smolin being more focused on the physics.

Reviews 

—The Guardian

—Peter Woit

See also

 Philosophy of time

References

External links
 
 

2014 non-fiction books
American non-fiction books
Books by Lee Smolin
Books by Roberto Mangabeira Unger
Contemporary philosophical literature
Cosmology books
English-language books
Philosophy of time
Popular physics books
Cambridge University Press books